Frost laws are seasonal restrictions on traffic weight limits and speeds on roadways subject to thaw weakening.

In climates that experience below-freezing temperatures, damage to roads from thaw-weakening have led to many US states, Canadian provinces and other jurisdictions to enact laws that restrict vehicle loads during spring months, when road structures are thawing from above in a manner that limits water from escaping the soil structure, thereby weakening the pavement underpinnings.

 The US state of Michigan, for example, during the months of March, April and May reduce legal axle weights of vehicles by up to 35%. Some states allow load increases on roads during the freezing season.

See also 
Frost heaving

References

External links 
 Michigan State Police press release on Frost Laws

Statutory law